Dawid Kasperski (born July 7, 1990) is a Polish Muay Thai kickboxer. He first came to prominence due to a successful amateur career by taking gold at the Kick-Box World Cup in 2013 and silver at the WAKO World Championships in the same year. Kasperski signed with the professional kickboxing promotion SUPERKOMBAT Fighting Championship in 2014, winning the SUPERKOMBAT Light heavyweight Tournament Champion on his debut on April 12. He is also a 14-time Polish Champion in Muay Thai, K-1 and kickboxing and Polish Professional Champion in K-1.

Kickboxing career
Kasperski took part in the 2014 SUPERKOMBAT World Grand Prix I. In the semifinals he won a unanimous decision against Ciprian Șchiopu, and won a split decision against Errol Koning in the finals.

He fought at the SUPERKOMBAT Final Elimination event, against Ibrahim El Bouni. Kasperski won the fight by majority decision.

Kasperski participated in the November SUPERKOMBAT Grand Prix as well, being scheduled to fight Aristote Quitusisa in the semifinals. Quitusisa won the fight by split decision.

He won the WAKO World K-1 Heavyweight title in June 2017, with a decision win over Gregory Grossi.

He fought Dylan Colin in November 2017, in the KFWC Savate Semifinals. He lost the fight by decision.

Kasperski fought Aleksei Dmitriev during DSF Kickboxing Challenge 14. He won the fight by unanimous decision.

He made his Glory debut against Yousri Belgaroui during Glory 53. Belgaroui won the fight by a second round TKO.

Achievements

Professional
2014 Fightsport Polish Kickboxer of the Year
2014 SUPERKOMBAT World Grand Prix I 2014 Tournament Winner
2017 WAKO World K-1 Heavyweight Championship

Amateur
2014 Polish K-1 Rules Champion −86 kg
2013 Kick-Box World Cup in Szeged, Hungary  −86 kg (K-1 Rules) 
2013 WAKO Amateur World Championships in Guarujá, Brazil  −86 kg (K-1 Rules)

Professional kickboxing record 

|-  bgcolor="#FFBBBB"
| 2018-05-12 || Loss||align=left| Yousri Belgaroui || Glory 53: Lille  || Lille, France || TKO (Four Knockdowns/Right Front Kick to the Body) || 2 ||  1:16
|-
|-  bgcolor="#CCFFCC"
| 2018-04-13|| Win ||align=left| Aleksei Dmitriev ||DSF Kickboxing Challenge 14 || Poland || Decision (Unanimous) || 3 || 3:00
|-
|-  bgcolor="#CCFFCC"
| 2017-12-09|| Win ||align=left| Mehdi Bouanane ||DSF Kickboxing Challenge 12 || Poland || Decision (Unanimous) || 3 || 3:00
|-
|-  bgcolor="#FFBBBB"
| 2017-11-24|| Loss ||align=left| Dylan Colin  ||-85 kg KFWC savate pro Semi Finals || France || Decision  || 3 || 3:00
|-  bgcolor="#FFBBBB"
| 2017-06-30 || Loss ||align=left| Gregory Grossi  || Monte Carlo Fighting Masters || Monte Carlo, Monaco || Decision || 5 || 3:00
|-
! style=background:white colspan=9 |
|- 
|-  bgcolor="#CCFFCC"
| 2016-07-31 || Win ||align=left|  Alexandru Negrea || SUPERKOMBAT World Grand Prix III 2016 || Mamaia, Romania || Decision (unanimous) || 3 || 3:00|-
|-
|-  bgcolor="#CCFFCC"
| 2017-04-21 || Win ||align=left| Adrian Valentin || Perun Fight Night || Trnava, Slovakia || Decision || 3 || 3:00
|-
|-  bgcolor="#FFBBBB"
| 2015-05-09 || Loss ||align=left| Maxim Vorovski || Xplosion Fight Series || Tallinn, Estonia || Decision || 3 || 3:00
|-
|-  bgcolor="#FFBBBB"
| 2014-11-22 || Loss ||align=left| Aristote Quitusisa || SUPERKOMBAT World Grand Prix 2014 Final, Semi Finals  || Monza, Italy || Decision (split) || 3 || 3:00
|-
|-  bgcolor="#CCFFCC"
| 2014-10-25 || Win ||align=left| Ibrahim El Bouni || SUPERKOMBAT World Grand Prix 2014 Final Elimination, Quarter Finals || Geneva, Switzerland || Decision (majority) || 3 || 3:00
|-
|-  bgcolor="#CCFFCC"
| 2014-04-12 || Win ||align=left| Errol Koning || SUPERKOMBAT World Grand Prix I 2014 || Reșița, Romania || Decision (split) || 3 || 3:00
|-
! colspan="8" style="background:white" |
|-
|-  bgcolor="#CCFFCC"
| 2014-04-12 || Win ||align=left| Ciprian Șchiopu || SUPERKOMBAT World Grand Prix I 2014 || Reșița, Romania || Decision (unanimous) || 3 || 3:00
|-
|-  bgcolor="#CCFFCC"
| 2013-12-14 || Win ||align=left| Łukasz Radosz || MFC 6 || Zielona Góra, Poland || Decision (unanimous) || 3 || 3:00
|-
|-  bgcolor="#CCFFCC"
| 2013-12-07 || Win ||align=left| Radosław Rydzewski || The Gladiators K-1 Rules II || Polkowice, Poland || Decision || 3 || 3:00
|-
|-  bgcolor="#CCFFCC"
| 2013-10-19 || Win ||align=left| Robert Paniączyk || Thai Battle II || Wrocław, Poland || KO (knee to the liver) || 1 || 2:35
|-
|-  bgcolor="#CCFFCC"
| 2013-06-29 || Win ||align=left| Jarosław Zawodni || The Gladiators K-1 Rules || Wrocław, Poland || Decision || 3 || 3:00
|- 
|-  bgcolor="#FFBBBB"
| 2011-06-10 || Loss ||align=left| Alexander Oleinik  || Masters || Poland || Decision || 3 || 3:00
|-
| colspan=9 | Legend:

See also
List of WAKO Amateur World Championships 
List of male kickboxers

References

1990 births
Living people
Polish male kickboxers
Middleweight kickboxers
Polish Muay Thai practitioners
People from Starachowice County
World Games gold medalists
Competitors at the 2017 World Games
SUPERKOMBAT kickboxers